The federal electoral districts (Spanish: distritos electorales federales) of Mexico are the 300 constituencies or electoral districts into which Mexico is divided for the purpose of federal elections. Each district returns one federal deputy (diputado), who sits in the Chamber of Deputies (Cámara de Diputados), the lower house of the Federal Congress. An additional 200 deputies are elected by proportional representation from the five electoral regions.

Electoral districts are identified by Roman numerals and by federal entity (state or the Federal District).  The number of electoral districts was set at 300 in 1979, when the number of seats in the Chamber of Deputies was increased from 196. The demarcation of the districts depends on the results of the previous electoral census, and adjustments to the 1979 districts were made in 1996 and 2005.

Irrespective of population, no state may be represented by fewer than two electoral districts. This is the case with Baja California Sur (population: 512,000), Campeche (population: 755,000) and Colima (population: 568,000), which, as a result, return more senators than deputies to Congress. The states with the most electoral districts are the state of México (population: 14 million), with 40, and Veracruz (population: 7.1 million), with 21. The Federal District, with a population of 8.8 million, has 27.

On 11 February 2005, the Federal Electoral Institute (now the National Electoral Institute) established the districts to be used in the 2006 general election and the 2009 mid-term election, in accordance with the following criteria: 
Each district to belong to only one federal entity.
Balanced distribution of population between districts.
Presence of indigenous populations.
Geographical continuity.
Travel times.

Under this scheme, the current electoral districts are the following:

Electoral districts 

The numbers indicate the number of districts in each federal entity for federal elections between 2006 and 2015.

States A-C

Aguascalientes 

 1st district: 1857-present
 2nd district: 1857-present
 3rd district: 1863-1902, 1997-present
 4th district: 1867-1902 (defunct)

Baja California 

 At-large: 1857-1955
 1st district: 1955-present
 2nd district: 1955-present
 3rd district: 1961-present
 4th district: 1964-1967, 1979-present
 5th district: 1979-present
 6th district: 1979-present
 7th district: 2006-present
 8th district: 2006-present

Baja California Sur 

 1st district: 1976-present
 2nd district: 1976-present

Campeche

Chiapas

Chihuahua

Coahuila

Colima

States D-M

Distrito Federal

Durango

Guanajuato

Guerrero

Hidalgo

Jalisco

State of México

Michoacán

Morelos

States N-Q

Nayarit

Nuevo León

Oaxaca

Puebla

Querétaro

Quintana Roo

States S-Z

San Luis Potosí

Sinaloa

Sonora

Tabasco

Tamaulipas

Tlaxcala

Veracruz

Yucatán

Zacatecas

See also 
Chamber of Deputies of Mexico
Elections in Mexico
Electoral regions of Mexico
Federal Electoral Institute

External links 
Electoral Districts  (Instituto Federal Electoral)

Politics of Mexico
Elections in Mexico

Mexico, Federal
Mexico politics-related lists